Dockyard and Engineering Works (DEW) Limited is a ship construction and repair yard at the Narayanganj, Bangladesh owned by the Government of Bangladesh under Ministry of Defence and managed by the Bangladesh Navy. The yard built many small to medium-sized patrol boats for the Bangladesh Coast Guard and landing craft for the Bangladesh Navy.

History
The shipyard was founded in 1922. Initially, it was a profit-making institution which continued after the independence of Bangladesh. But it experienced a period of loss starting from the nineties. As a result, it was laid off in 2002. On 7 December 2007, the yard was handed over to the Bangladesh Navy. From then, it is regaining its standard. This shipyard has constructed the Pabna Class riverine patrol boats from 1972 to 1977, which are the first Bangladesh made warships.

Naval projects
Pabna Class riverine patrol boats
Shobuj Bangla class inshore patrol vessels
Fast Patrol Boats
Harbour patrol boats
Landing craft tank
X-12 patrol boats

See also
Chittagong Dry Dock Limited
Khulna Shipyard
Shipbuilding in Bangladesh

References

Defence companies of Bangladesh
Shipbuilding companies of Bangladesh
Shipyards of Bangladesh
Government-owned companies of Bangladesh
Organisations based in Narayanganj